is a Japanese actress. She is represented with Hirata Office.

Biography
Kajiwara debuted as a child actress in the stage play Fall Guy in 2000. She was represented by Horipro Improvement Academy when she was a child actress.

Kajiwara appeared in Kamen Rider Blade. In The Queen's Classroom, in which she played Erika Sato, she is a close friend with co-star Mirai Shida. Kajiwara was represented by M's Factory at the time and later moved to Hirata Office in September 2012.

Her hobbies are watching films and listening to music, playing the koto, and exercising in general.

Filmography

TV drama

Films

Internet drama

Stage

Direct-to-video

Radio drama

Advertisements

Music videos

References

Sources

Notes

External links
 
Prolog Vol. 26 introduction 

Japanese child actresses
Actresses from Tokyo
1992 births
Living people
21st-century Japanese actresses
20th-century Japanese actresses